Bonnie Jean Beecher ( Boettcher), later known as Jahanara Romney, (born April 25, 1941) is an American activist, and retired actress and singer.

About
Bonnie Jean Boettcher was born April 25, 1941, in Minneapolis, Minnesota, to Art and Jean Boettcher.

She knew Bob Dylan during his early career, they dated briefly in college, and she may have been the inspiration for his song "Girl from the North Country". However, it may have been about his high school girlfriend, Echo Helstrom or another later girlfriend Suze Rotolo, or no one person in particular. Beecher's singing is heard on Dylan's 1960 bootleg recording known as the "Minneapolis Party Tape", which was recorded while they were dating. Some of Dylan's earliest recordings in 1961 were recorded at her Minneapolis home.

She made her television debut The Twilight Zone episode, "Come Wander with Me" (1964). She also played Sylvia, Chekov's love interest in "Spectre of the Gun", a 1968 episode of Star Trek wherein the crew of the Enterprise re-enacts the gunfight at the OK Corral.

Personal life
Beecher married Wavy Gravy (born Hugh Romney) on May 22, 1967. She adopted the name Jahanara Romney shortly after marriage. The couple have a son together, born in 1971 as Howdy Do-Good Gravy Tomahawk Truckstop Romney, who has since become known as Jordan Romney.

She has worked as administrative director of Camp Winnarainbow since 1983. Her husband serves as director of the camp, which is located near Laytonville, Mendocino County in Northern California.

Filmography

References

External links

1941 births
Living people
American television actresses
Actresses from Minneapolis
21st-century American women